Anchor Bay Entertainment (formerly Video Treasures, Starmaker Entertainment, and Starz Home Entertainment) was an American home entertainment and production company owned by Starz Inc., which is a subsidiary of Lionsgate. Anchor Bay Entertainment marketed and released feature films, television series, television specials and short films on DVD. In 2004, Anchor Bay agreed to have its movies distributed by 20th Century Fox Home Entertainment and renewed their deal in 2011. In 2017, Lions Gate Entertainment folded Anchor Bay Entertainment into Lionsgate Home Entertainment.

History
Anchor Bay Entertainment dates its origins back to two separate home video distributors: Video Treasures, formed in 1985, and Starmaker Entertainment, founded in 1988. Both companies sold budget items — reissues of previously released home video programming — at discount prices. Video Treasures started with public domain titles, and later made licensing deals with CST Entertainment (which released colorized titles through the Classicolor logo), Vestron Video, Heron Communications (including Media Home Entertainment and Hi-Tops Video), Britt Allcroft (the Thomas the Tank Engine series; this was inherited from Strand Home Video when Video Treasures purchased that label from VCI in 1993), Trans World Entertainment, Regal Video, Virgin Vision, Hal Roach Studios, Jerry Lewis, and Orion Pictures, among others. Starmaker's major distributions were films from the then-recently out-of-business New World Pictures and programs previously licensed to their video division. Viacom programs and Saturday Night Live compilations were other notable Starmaker releases. The companies competed with each other for years, until they were sold to the Handleman Company, and formed a new corporate umbrella: Anchor Bay Entertainment, on May 2, 1995. The company also bought out (through the Video Treasures and Starmaker acquisitions) other budget home video and music distributors such as MNTEX Entertainment, Teal Entertainment, Burbank Video, Drive Entertainment, and GTS Records.  Both the Video Treasures and Starmaker labels were phased out a few years later.

In the late 1990s and early 2000s, Anchor Bay specialized in the release of horror films, particularly cult films and slasher movies from the 1970s and 1980s. One of its first releases was Prom Night in 1980. It also released Halloween (as well as its 3rd, 4th, and 5th sequels), Hellraiser, and many others, leading the home video market for obscure and retro horror films.

In October 2000, Anchor Bay Entertainment expanded to the United Kingdom.

In 2003, Handleman sold Anchor Bay to IDT Entertainment, at the time a newly formed entertainment division of telecommunications company IDT Corporation. On February 4, 2005, the Securities and Exchange Commission filed civil charges against two former employees of Anchor Bay Entertainment, formerly owned by Handleman. The SEC's complaint, which was filed in the United States District Court for the Eastern District of Michigan, alleges that the two employees caused the company to enter into a 2 million-dollar fraudulent transactions. The transactions involved the purported sale of slow-moving or obsolete inventory to business partners coupled with secret buy-back provisions. The inventory included worthless video boxes and sleeves and DVDs for films. Handleman subsequently restated its financial statements to correct these accounting errors. 

In 2006, Liberty Media, the owner of the Starz cable network, purchased IDT Entertainment from IDT Corporation and renamed it Starz Media.

In May 2007, Anchor Bay was renamed as Starz Home Entertainment (SHE). A month later, it was announced on June 19, 2007, that Starz Home Entertainment would begin releasing high-definition versions of its films exclusively in the Blu-ray format. In 2008, Starz Home Entertainment was changed back to Anchor Bay Entertainment.

Sony Pictures Home Entertainment had a three-year deal with Anchor Bay Entertainment for worldwide DVD releases, with the exceptions of North America, Canada, Australia, and the United Kingdom.

On January 4, 2011, Starz, LLC sold 25% of Starz Media to The Weinstein Company, which rendered Anchor Bay the de facto video distributor of films made by TWC and Dimension. Starz later bought back the Weinstein's stake in October 2015, with Anchor Bay continuing to release TWC and Dimension video releases.

In early 2015, Anchor Bay UK (alongside Manga Entertainment UK) was bought from Starz by managing director Colin Lomax and renamed to Platform Entertainment. Kaleidoscope Film Distribution would acquire Platform in December 2016, with Manga Entertainment UK becoming a separate entity and operating on its own, which itself was eventually acquired by Funimation in 2019.

On June 30, 2016, Lionsgate agreed to acquire Anchor Bay's parent company Starz Inc. for $4.4 billion in cash and stock. The Starz/Lionsgate merger was completed on December 8, 2016. On August 29, 2017, Anchor Bay was folded into Lionsgate Home Entertainment. From August 30, 2017 to 2021, Anchor Bay's website remained online, but with all the links broken.

Licensed content

Films
 Most of the libraries of EMI Films, and Alexander Salkind (via StudioCanal) (now handled by Lionsgate)
 Select 20th Century Fox titles under license from 20th Century Fox Home Entertainment
 Some of the Universal Pictures films under license from Universal Home Video such as Army of Darkness, The Car and Repo Man, although licensing on these have reverted to Universal Pictures Home Entertainment.
 Davis-Panzer Productions (The Osterman Weekend)
 Moustapha Akkad's Trancas International Pictures (production company behind the Halloween series)
 New World Pictures (The Boys Next Door, Children of the Corn, Creepshow 2, Girls Just Want to Have Fun, Heathers, Godzilla 1985, etc.) (now handled by Image Entertainment through their deal with Lakeshore Entertainment)
 Most of the 1950s–1980s Walt Disney Productions/Walt Disney Pictures live-action library, as well as the film library of American Broadcasting Company, under license from Walt Disney Studios Home Entertainment (The Black Hole, The Cat from Outer Space, Condorman, One Magic Christmas, The Devil and Max Devlin, The Happiest Millionaire, The Great Locomotive Chase, Return to Oz, Tex, The North Avenue Irregulars, The Watcher in the Woods, etc.), although licensing has reverted to Walt Disney Studios Home Entertainment, while the ABC library is currently distributed by Kino Lorber under license from Disney (formerly MGM Home Entertainment). 
 Overture Films, also owned by Starz Distribution
 The Weinstein Company (now Lantern Entertainment) and Dimension Films from March 2011 until Anchor Bay went defunct in 2017 (now handled by Lionsgate)
 The libraries of Media Home Entertainment, Prism Entertainment, Wizard Video and Regal Video
 Worked alongside Troma Entertainment in re-releasing some of their older films on Blu-ray as well as distributing their newest production, Return to Nuke 'Em High.
 Against the Wild 1 & 2, from writer/director, Richard Boddington

Horror
During its original incarnation in the late 1990s and early 2000s, Anchor Bay specialized in the release of horror and cult films, particularly those of the 1970s and 1980s. The company's first-ever DVD release was The Car in April 1997, followed by Elvira, Mistress of the Dark that August, and an extended cut (erroneously titled as a director's cut) of Dawn of the Dead in November 1997. The company's next release was Prom Night in February 1998.

It also released Halloween (as well as its third and fourth sequels), Sleepaway Camp, Alice, Sweet Alice, The Hills Have Eyes, Suspiria, Maniac, the first three Hellraiser films, The Wicker Man, Silent Night, Deadly Night, Children of the Corn, The Beyond and several Lucio Fulci films. Some of these were given numbered limited edition releases which included multiple discs, information booklets and collectible tin cases. Many of these releases have since gone out of print and became sought-after collectibles.

Anchor Bay is also noted for the release of the Evil Dead film trilogy on DVD, in numerous editions. Army of Darkness for example, had been released in both a regular and limited edition set that featured the director's cut. Since then, the director's cut has been re-released on two occasions in addition to a 2-disc "Boomstick Edition" of the film as well. Until Anchor Bay released The Evil Dead on VHS and DVD, it was previously unavailable on video from a major label.

Also among its more profitable releases has been George A. Romero's Living Dead series. Anchor Bay has distribution rights for the middle two films in the tetralogy: Dawn and Day, however, it has also distributed DVDs of the original, Night of the Living Dead, which is in the public domain. Like the Evil Dead trilogy, the Living Dead series has seen many editions on DVD. Dawn has itself seen several releases on DVD, the most extra feature-laden being the Ultimate Edition in late 2004. An Evil Dead 3-disc Ultimate Edition DVD was released in December 2007.

Special interest
In addition to feature films, Anchor Bay distributed special interest titles, including children's series, such as Bobby's World and Mister Rogers' Neighborhood. Until 2008, they distributed Thomas & Friends videos. Thomas has reached platinum-selling status and, in 2004, ranked consistently on the VideoScan ranking top 50 chart of children's weekly video sales. Lionsgate acquired the Thomas DVD titles after HIT Entertainment bought out the rights to Thomas. Rights to the Thomas DVDs now belong to Universal (through their deal with Mattel, HIT's current parent company). The company also has a top market share for fitness videos such as the Crunch and For Dummies series. The company also distributed UFC events on DVD and Blu-ray.

Production company
As a full-fledged production company, it handled TV syndication of Halloween, Halloween 4 and Halloween 5 (to which it also holds the video rights) and have recently entered in-house production and distribution of theatrical films.

Award
Anchor Bay Entertainment received a Special Achievement Award from the Academy of Science Fiction, Fantasy & Horror Films in June 2002. Anchor Bay was recognized as one of the "pioneers in DVD releases and home video entertainment" and "successful in releasing dramas, comedies, foreign films, children's programming, and most prominently genre films." Cited as highlights of Anchor Bay's releases were "the films of Hammer Studios, the works of Werner Herzog, Paul Verhoeven, Wim Wenders, John Woo, Monte Hellman and Sam Raimi".

Past names
 Video Treasures
 Starmaker Entertainment
 MNTEX Entertainment
 Teal Entertainment
 Burbank Video
 Troy Gold
 Viking Video Classics
 Drive Entertainment
 GTS Records
 Media Home Entertainment
 Strand Home Video

See also
 List of films released by Anchor Bay Entertainment

References

External links
 Official U.S. website
 Official U.K. website
 Official Australian website

Home video companies of the United States
Film production companies of the United States
Film distributors of the United States
Former Liberty Media subsidiaries
Companies based in Troy, Michigan
Mass media companies established in 1985
Mass media companies disestablished in 2017
1985 establishments in Michigan
Starz Entertainment Group
Lionsgate subsidiaries
The Weinstein Company
2017 disestablishments in California